Legal Mavericks 2020, also known as Legal Mavericks 2, is a legal, crime, detective television drama produced by TVB. It serves as the second season to 2017's Legal Mavericks and stars Vincent Wong, Owen Cheung, Sisley Choi, Kelly Cheung and Paul Chun. Lam Chi-wah serves as the producer.

Cast and characters

Main Characters
Vincent Wong as Hope Man San Hap, a blind lawyer who strives for justice for the disadvantaged, using his other heightened senses and legally controversial methods to seek truths behind his court cases. 
Owen Cheung as Santiago "Gogo" Kuk Yat Ha, an ex-policeman turned private investigator and Hope's housemate.
Sisley Choi as Deanie "Dino" Chiu Ching Mui, a legal executive working for Hope, who has a heroic spirit due to her mafia family background. In addition to being a law clerk, she also owns a bar called Pledge. Later became a Barrister and James' disciple.
Kelly Cheung as Eva Shaw Mei Na, a competitive lawyer.
Paul Chun as James Kan Siu Wang, a Senior Counsel and Queen's Counsel, Eva's master and Hope's former master.

Notable Characters
Lesley Chiang as Kong Bo Chai, nicknamed "Chai" by Gogo. An Inspector of Police of the Regional Crime Unit. She was Gogo’s ex-girlfriend when he was still in the force.
Jessica Kan as Jasmine Kwok Lam, a pupil lawyer and disciple of Hope.
Chun Wong as Chiu Cheung Fung, Dino’s father.
Hugo Wong as Walter Wah Chun Ngok, a Senior Prosecutor of the Department of Justice.
Cheung Kwok-keung as Fok Ting Pong, the Secretary of Justice.

References

TVB dramas
Hong Kong action television series
Hong Kong crime television series
2020 Hong Kong television series debuts